is a railway station on the Kyūdai Main Line operated by JR Kyushu in Hita, Ōita Prefecture, Japan.

Lines

Layout 
The station consists of an island platform with two tracks at grade. The station building is a modern structure which houses a waiting area, a staffed ticket window as well as the local tourism information centre. The platform is at a higher level than the station building and is accessed by a flight of steps.

Management of the station has been outsourced to the JR Kyushu Tetsudou Eigyou Co., a wholly owned subsidiary of JR Kyushu specialising in station services. It staffs the ticket counter which is equipped with a POS machine but does not have a Midori no Madoguchi facility.

Adjacent stations

History
The Daito Railway was nationalized on 1 December 1922, after which Japanese Government Railways (JGR) undertook phased westward expansion of the track which, at the time, it had designated as the Daito Line. By 1932, the track had reached . Subsequently, the track was extended further west and Amagase opened as the new western terminus on 29 September 1933. The track of the Daito Line was then re-designated as part of the Kyudai Main Line. With the privatization of Japanese National Railways (JNR), the successor of JGR, on 1 April 1987, the station came under the control of JR Kyushu.

Passenger statistics
In fiscal 2015, there were a total of 28,329 boarding passengers, giving a daily average of 78 passengers.

See also
 List of railway stations in Japan

References

External links
Amagase(JR Kyushu)

Railway stations in Ōita Prefecture
Railway stations in Japan opened in 1933